James C. Dimora (born June 21, 1955) is an American politician who served as Cuyahoga County Commissioner from 1998 until 2010, and as chairman of the county Democratic Party from 1994 until 2009.  Before being elected county commissioner, Dimora served as mayor of Bedford Heights, Ohio for 17 years.  In 2012 Dimora was convicted of 32 charges including racketeering, bribery, conspiracy, and tax charges and sentenced to 28 years in federal prison in one of the largest criminal corruption cases in Ohio history. He is currently serving his sentence at the Federal Medical Center, Devens in Ayer, Massachusetts, with a release date of 2031. His inmate number is 56275-060.

The corruption case led to a change in the nature of the county government: one year after the beginning of the case, "county voters elected to change the form of government from commission-based to one with a county executive."

References

1955 births
Mayors of places in Ohio
Living people
People from Bedford Heights, Ohio
Politicians convicted of mail and wire fraud